This Is an EP Release is the RIAA gold-certified EP by  Digital Underground, from which "Tie the Knot" and "Same Song" were featured in the film Nothing But Trouble (which the EP liner notes refer to by its prerelease title, "Valkenvania"), starring Dan Aykroyd, Chevy Chase, Demi Moore and John Candy. "Tie the Knot" contained jazz-influenced piano tracks and a comedic interpretation of "Bridal Chorus" and "Same Song" contains an organ solo and improvised organ sections throughout the song. Tupac Shakur made his debut on the latter song, and portrayed an African king in the video. Tupac also can be heard on "The Way We Swing" (Remix) as a background vocalist, adding humorous ad-libs between the verses.

Two different versions of the track "Same Song" were recorded; a long version, which runs over six minutes, and an edit, which runs four minutes. Also a music video was made for "Same Song" using new footage from cast members from the film Nothing But Trouble, as well as clips from the film. Dan Aykroyd appears portraying a Scottish bagpipe artist, as well as a Los Angeles gang member while Dr. Dre and Eazy-E make cameo appearances.

Track listing
"Same Song" feat. 2Pac
"Tie the Knot"
"The Way We Swing" (Remix)
"Nuttin' Nis Funky"
"Packet Man" (Worth a Packet Remix)
"Arguin' on the Funk"

Samples
"Tie the Knot"
"Treulich Geführt" by Richard Wagner
"Synthetic Substitution" by Melvin Bliss
"Nuttin' Nis Funky"
"Fat Time" by Miles Davis
"Arguin' on the Funk"
"Flash Light" by Parliament
"Pumpin' It Up" by P-Funk All Stars
"Packet Man [Worth a Packet Remix]"
"Windy City" by Rodney Franklin
"Same Song"
"Walk This Way" by Aerosmith
"Theme From the Black Hole" by Parliament

Charts

Weekly charts

Year-end charts

Certifications

References

Digital Underground albums
Tupac Shakur
Tommy Boy Records EPs
T.N.T. Recording albums
1991 debut EPs